The 2013–14 Wright State Raiders men's basketball team represented Wright State University during the 2013–14 NCAA Division I men's basketball season. The Raiders, led by fourth year head coach Billy Donlon, played their home games at the Nutter Center and were members of the Horizon League. They finished the season 21–15, 10–6 in Horizon League play to finish in third place. They advanced to the championship game of the Horizon League tournament where they lost to Milwaukee. They were invited to the 2014 CollegeInsider.com Tournament where they defeated East Carolina in the first round before losing in the second round to Ohio.

Roster

Schedule

|-
!colspan=9 style="background:#355E3B; color:#FFD700;"| Regular season

|-
!colspan=9 style="background:#355E3B; color:#FFD700;"| Horizon League tournament

|-
!colspan=9 style="background:#355E3B; color:#FFD700;"| CIT

References

Wright State Raiders men's basketball seasons
Wright State
Wright State
Wright
Wright